In Christian theology, the beatific vision is the ultimate direct self-communication of God to the individual person. A person possessing the beatific vision reaches, as a member of redeemed humanity in the communion of saints, perfect salvation in its entirety, i.e., heaven. The notion of vision stresses the intellectual component of salvation, though it encompasses the whole of human experience of joy, happiness coming from seeing God finally face to face and not imperfectly through faith. (1 Cor 13:11–12).

It is related to the Catholic and Eastern Orthodox belief in theosis, the Wesleyan notion of Christian perfection, and is seen in most – if not all – church denominations as the reward for Christians in the afterlife.

Etymology
"Beatific" comes from the Latin past participle beatifica, to make happy. "Vision" comes from the Latin nominative visio, to see. The beatifica visio is to see something that makes one happy.

Jewish background
According to Rashi, the face of God is God's care for Israel ("And I will hide My face on that day, because of all the evil they have committed, when they turned to other deities.") and God's essence ("Then I will remove My hand, and you will see My back but My face shall not be seen.")

History

In Christianity, the Bible states that God "dwells in unapproachable light, whom no one has even seen or can see"  (1 Timothy 6:16), but when God reveals himself to us in heaven we will then see him face to face (1 Corinthians 13:12). This concept has been termed "the beatific vision of God" by theologians of the Catholic Church and later on by various Protestant denominations, including the Lutheran Church and the Methodist Church.

Cyprian wrote of the saved's seeing God in the Kingdom of Heaven.
How great will your glory and happiness be, to be allowed to see God, to be honored with sharing the joy of salvation and eternal light with Christ your Lord and God... to delight in the joy of immortality in the Kingdom of Heaven with the righteous and God's friends!

Edward A. Pace in the Catholic Encyclopedia (1907) defined the beatific vision:
The immediate knowledge of God which the angelic spirits and the souls of the just enjoy in Heaven. It is called "vision" to distinguish it from the mediate knowledge of God which the human mind may attain in the present life. And since in beholding God face to face the created intelligence finds perfect happiness, the vision is termed "beatific."

Methodist co-founder Charles Wesley, in his 1747 hymn "Maker, in Whom We Live", described union with God through the Holy Spirit as "beatific sight":
Spirit of Holiness, let all thy saints adore / thy sacred energy, and bless thine heart-renewing power. / No angel tongues can tell thy love's ecstatic height, / the glorious joy unspeakable, the beatific sight.

In the Catholic Church

Official teaching

Nature of the vision of God
The beatific vision is when God, though transcendent, opens himself up to man and gives man the capacity to contemplate God in all His heavenly glory. Contemplation is the prayer of silently focusing on God and heeding His word; in other words, contemplation is the prayer of uniting with God.

Sanctifying grace and the vision of God
The beatific vision, then, is ultimate union with God; indeed, it comes from sharing in God's holy nature via sanctifying grace.

Effect of the vision of God
Because God is beatitude and holiness itself, the beatific vision entails ultimate beatitude and holiness.

Recipients of the vision of God
The beatific vision is a grace and a privilege intended for every man and angel, since God created men and angels to enjoy the beatific vision; the beatific vision is the ultimate purpose of each person's and angel's life.

Jesus and the vision of God
Because Jesus is God and man, His human nature experienced the beatific vision from conception to His ascension into heaven. Despite this, Jesus did suffer as man.

Thomas Aquinas

Thomas Aquinas defined the beatific vision as the human being's "final end" in which one attains to a perfect happiness.  Thomas reasons that one is perfectly happy only when all one's desires are perfectly satisfied, to the degree that happiness could not increase and could not be lost. "Man is not perfectly happy, so long as something remains for him to desire and seek." But this kind of perfect happiness cannot be found in any physical pleasure, any amount of worldly power, any degree of temporal fame or honor, or indeed in any finite reality. It can only be found in something that is infinite and perfect – and this is God. And since God is not a material thing but is pure spirit, we are united to God by knowing and loving Him. Consequently, the union with God is the most perfect human happiness and the ultimate goal of human life. But we cannot attain to this happiness by our own natural powers; it is a gift that must be given us by God, who strengthens us by the "light of glory" so that we can see Him as he is, without any intermediary. (Thomas quotes Psalm 36:9 on this point: "In your light we shall see light.") Further, since every created image or likeness of God (including even the most perfect "ideas" or "images" of God we might generate in our minds) is necessarily finite, it would thus be infinitely less than God himself. The only perfect and infinite good, therefore, is God Himself, which is why Aquinas argues that our perfect happiness and final end can only be the direct union with God Himself and not with any created image of Him. This union comes about by a kind of "seeing" perfectly the divine essence itself, a gift given to our intellects when God joins them directly to Himself without any intermediary. And since in seeing this perfect vision of what (and who) God is, we grasp also His perfect goodness, this act of "seeing" is at the same time a perfect act of loving God as the highest and infinite goodness.

According to Aquinas, the beatific vision surpasses both faith and reason. Rational knowledge does not fully satisfy humankind's innate desire to know God, since reason is primarily concerned with sensible objects and thus can only infer its conclusions about God indirectly.

The theological virtue of faith, too, is incomplete, since Aquinas states that it always implies some imperfection in the understanding. The believer does not wish to remain merely on the level of faith but to grasp directly the object of faith, who is God himself.

Thus only the fullness of the beatific vision satisfies this fundamental desire of the human soul to know God. Quoting Paul, Aquinas notes "We see now in a glass darkly, but then face to face" (i Cor. 13:12). The beatific vision is the final reward for those saints elected by God to partake in and "enjoy the same happiness wherewith God is happy, seeing Him in the way which He sees Himself" in the next life.

Roman Catechism
According to the Roman Catechism, the saints in heaven see God, whereby they share in God's nature, wherewith they are truly and always happy. The catechism elaborates that the saints' happiness includes not just joy, but also glory (knowledge of one another's dignity), honor (reverence for one another as adopted sons of God), and peace (fulfillment of all the heart's desires). Moreover, the catechism adds, the beatific vision will, on Judgment Day, make the saints' resurrected bodies impassible (free from inconvenience, suffering, and death), bright as the angels, agile (free from the limitations of space-time), and subtle (as subject to the soul as the soul is subject to God).

Pope John XXII and the beatific vision controversy

Pope John XXII (1316–1334) caused a controversy involving beatific vision, saying — not as Pope but as a private theologian — the saved do not attain the beatific vision until Judgment Day, a view more consistent with soul sleep. The general understanding at the time was that the saved attained Heaven after being purified and before Judgment Day. He never proclaimed his belief as doctrine but rather as an opinion (see ex cathedra, as defined at the First Vatican Council in 1870).

The Sacred College of Cardinals held a consistory on the problem in January 1334, and Pope John backed away from his novel views to the more standard understanding.

His successor, Pope Benedict XII, declared it doctrine that the saved see Heaven (and thus, God) before Judgement Day.

Catechism of the Catholic Church
According to the Catechism of the Catholic Church and the Compendium of the Catechism of the Catholic Church, the beatific vision is God opening himself in an inexhaustible way to the saints, so that they can see him face to face, and thereby share in his nature, and therefore enjoy eternal, definitive, supreme, perfect, and ever new happiness. The catechism teaches that this happiness includes not just communion and perfect life with the Trinity and the saints, but also the fulfillment of all the heart's desires - including, on Judgment Day, the body being glorified, even endowed with impassibility, brightness, agility, and subtlety - and continual cooperation with God's will - including praying for all other people, even proffering one's merits to God for others' sake. The catechism elaborates that the beatific vision is a grace and a privilege intended for everyone to attain, and that the beatific vision is attained immediately after death – or after purgatory – yet it is already foretasted in baptism and in the eucharist. The catechism also teaches that the beatific vision is expressed in different ways in the New Testament: the kingdom of God, the vision of God, eternal life, divine adoption, a share in the divine nature, the joy of the Lord, and rest in God.

Catholic Encyclopedia
The Catholic Encyclopedia defines the beatific vision as the immediate knowledge of God enjoyed by all the heavenly creatures. It explains that the vision of God is called "beatific" because by seeing God the mind finds perfect happiness, and called "vision" because the sight of God in heaven is not the same as mediate knowledge of God.

See also
 Theoria

Notes

References
 
 

Afterlife in Christianity
Islamic eschatology
Christian mysticism
Thomas Aquinas
Heaven in Christianity